Cumshewa, also Go'mshewah, Cummashawa, Cummashawaas, Cumchewas, Gumshewa was an important hereditary leader of the Haida people of Haida Gwaii on the North Coast of British Columbia, Canada.  His name is believed to be of either Kwak'wala or Heiltsuk (Bella Bella) origin, meaning "rich at the mouth of the river". He is mentioned by Captain George Dixon who traded with him in 1787.  In 1794, Cumshewa and his warriors massacred the crew of the American vessel Resolution.

Legacy
Cumshewa is commemorated on the map of the archipelago by Cumshewa Inlet, Cumshewa Mountain, Cumshewa Head (a point), Cumshewa Island, the Cumshewa Rocks and the modern First Nations locality of Cumshewa (which is on the inlet of that name).

References

 

Haida people
Indigenous leaders in British Columbia
Pre-Confederation British Columbia people
18th-century indigenous people of the Americas